Ben Aknoun is a commune of Algiers Province and a suburb of the city of Algiers in northern Algeria. As of the 2008 census, the commune's population was 18,838.

The Ministry of Finance has its head office in the Immeuble Ahmed Francis (Ahmed Francis Building) in Ben Aknoun.

Education

The presence of a large diplomatic community in Ben Aknoun prompted the creation of international educational institutions. The American International School of Algiers provides an academic program for English-speaking students from kindergarten to the seventh grade, taught by U.S. educators. A French school, Lycée International Alexandre-Dumas d'Alger, has also its campus set in the city, serving French-speaking students from primary school to senior high school.

Notable people

References

Suburbs of Algiers
Communes of Algiers Province